D. striata may refer to:
 Dendroica striata, the blackpoll warbler, a bird species found in northern North America
 Discina striata, a brachiopod species

See also